The 2011 Delta State gubernatorial by-election was the 1st gubernatorial by-election of Delta State after the 2011 Delta State gubernatorial election was annulled. Held on January 6, 2011, the People's Democratic Party nominee Emmanuel Uduaghan won the election, defeating Great Ogboru of the Democratic People's Party.

Results 
A total of 15 candidates contested in the election. Emmanuel Uduaghan from the People's Democratic Party won the election, defeating Great Ogboru from the Democratic People's Party. Registered voters was 1,548,647, valid votes was 433,312, votes cast was 450,376, 17,064 votes was cancelled. Emmanuel Uduaghan from the People's Democratic Party won in 14 local government areas, while Great Ogboru from the Democratic People's Party won in 11 out of 25 local government areas in the state.

References 

Delta State gubernatorial elections
Delta gubernatorial
January 2011 events in Nigeria